Kholsha-e Chahardeh (also Romanized as Kholshā-e Chahārdeh and Kholshā’-e Chahārdeh) is a village in Chahardeh Rural District, in the Central District of Astaneh-ye Ashrafiyeh County, Gilan Province, Iran. At the 2006 census, its population was 331, in 104 families.

References 

Populated places in Astaneh-ye Ashrafiyeh County